Fladry is a rope mounted along the top of a fence, from which are suspended strips of fabric or colored flags, that will flap in a breeze. They are intended to deter wolves from crossing the line. Fladry lines have been used for this purpose for several centuries, traditionally for hunting wolves in Eastern Europe. They may be used to protect livestock in small pastures from wolves. They are effective temporarily, as the novelty may soon wear off, usually between three and five months. 

Sometimes this technique is used to alert horses and cattle to the presence of a fence, as the use of smoothwire fences and one strand of electric may not be seen by an animal unfamiliar with such. 

The use of fladry also has been suggested among techniques to prevent wolves from being attracted to dead stock that may be in conditions that make it difficult for ranchers to remove or bury the carcasses, which endangers the livestock herd once the wolves are attracted.

In culture
Russian singer and songwriter Vladimir Vysotsky (1938-1980) mentions fladry in his famous song "Wolf Hunt" (1968). Fladry is used here as a symbol of treacherous attitude of hunters toward the animals, but it may be understood as a metaphor of the stance of powers-that-be toward the people of free spirit. The "Wolf Hunt" was one of the most famous songs in the USSR during the 1970s.

References

Fences
Wolf hunting
Livestock